is a Japanese former figure skater. He is the 2007 and 2008 Japanese national bronze medalist. He competed at the 2008 World Championships, placing 19th with a personal best total score in international competition.

Programs

Competitive highlights

References

External links

 

Japanese male single skaters
Sportspeople from Fukuoka (city)
1985 births
Living people
Competitors at the 2005 Winter Universiade
Competitors at the 2009 Winter Universiade
21st-century Japanese people